Scopula suna is a moth of the  family Geometridae. It is found in Kenya.

References

Moths described in 1934
Taxa named by Louis Beethoven Prout
suna
Moths of Africa